Lungile Tsolekile (born 19 April 1984) is a South African field hockey player who competed in the 2008 Summer Olympics.

References

External links
 
 
  (2006)
  (2014)
 
 

1984 births
Living people
South African male field hockey players
Olympic field hockey players of South Africa
Field hockey players at the 2008 Summer Olympics
Field hockey players at the 2006 Commonwealth Games
Field hockey players at the 2014 Commonwealth Games
Commonwealth Games competitors for South Africa
2006 Men's Hockey World Cup players
2014 Men's Hockey World Cup players